The Union for France (UPF) was an electoral alliance between the Rally for the Republic and Union for French Democracy formed from 1992 until 1995.

The label is used in the 2022 French legislative election by an alliance consisting of Debout la France, Les Patriotes, and Generation Frexit.

References

Defunct political party alliances in France
Rally for the Republic
Union for French Democracy